Binary distribution is the presence of two or more very large and dominant cities in a country.

Countries with binary distribution
 Australia (Melbourne, Sydney)
 Brazil (São Paulo, Rio de Janeiro)
 Canada (Toronto, Montréal)
 China (Shanghai, Beijing)
 India (Mumbai, Delhi)
 Italy (Rome, Milan)
 Japan (Tokyo, Osaka-Kobe-Kyoto)
 Netherlands (Amsterdam, Rotterdam)
 Russia (Moscow, Saint Petersburg)
 Spain (Madrid, Barcelona)
 Turkey (Ankara, Istanbul)
 USA (New York City, Los Angeles)
 Vietnam (Ho Chi Minh City, Hanoi)

References

Geography terminology
Urban studies and planning terminology